The Nationalist Officers' Organization was an Iraqi organization made up of Iraqi officers which is similar to the Free Officers' Organization in Egypt. The members of this organization arose in the 1958 July revolution, when it led this movement in the toppling of the monarchy and the establishment of a republic.

References

Sources
 

Modern history of Iraq